The highest-selling singles in Japan are ranked in the Oricon Weekly Chart, which is published by Oricon Style magazine. The data are compiled by Oricon based on each singles' weekly physical sales. In 2010 25 singles reached number-one.

Chart history

References 

2010 in Japanese music
Japan
Lists of number-one songs in Japan